Siegfried K. Wiedmann (born in 1938) is a German electrical engineer noted for his contributions to semiconductor technologies for integrated circuits.

Wiedmann was born in Plochingen, Germany. He received the Diplom-Ingenieur (1963) and Doctor-Ingenieur (1967) degrees in electrical engineering from the University of Applied Sciences Stuttgart, then worked at the IBM Laboratories in Böblingen, Germany and in the United States, ultimately becoming an IBM Fellow. Together with Horst H. Berger, Wiedmann received the 1977 IEEE Morris N. Liebmann Memorial Award "for the invention and exploration of the Merged Transistor Logic, MTL".

Selected works
 H. H. Berger and S. K. Wiedmann, "Merged-Transistor Logic (MTL) - A Low-Cost Bipolar Logic Concept",  IEEE Journal of Solid-State Circuits, vol. SC-7, No. 5, Oct. 1972, pp. 340–346.

References
High-Speed Split-Emitter 12L/MTL Memory Cell

1938 births
Living people
People from Esslingen (district)
German electrical engineers
IBM Fellows
Engineers from Baden-Württemberg
Academic staff of the Technical University of Berlin